Adrian Harper (born 4 May 1985) is an Irish professional footballer who plays for Bluebell United.

Career

Early years
Starting as a trainee with Sheffield United, Harper was captain of the youth and reserve teams for 3 years. He was loaned out to Scarborough Fc, making 5 appearances. After 5 years at Sheffield United Harper was released and signed for Glenavon Fc where he made a permanent move to the Lurgan club in October 2006.

Irish League
Harper signed for Glenavon in October 2006 and scored his first goals for the club in January 2007 with a brace against Ballymena. During that season Glenavon avoided relegation with a penalty shoot out play off victory against Bangor, a game which saw Harper red carded in injury time.

Better years were to come at the club following new investment and Harper, a fans favourite went on to make 117 appearances under 4 different managers.

Later years
In the summer of 2011 Harper joined his local Leinster Senior League side Glebe North↵where he spent 3 months before signing for Bluebell United where he has remained since. Harper now runs his own successful gym company ProFitness Gym in Ireland.

Honours

Team
Glenavon
 Mid-Ulster Cup:  2009/2010, 2010/2011

References

1976 births
Living people
Republic of Ireland association footballers
Association football forwards
Shamrock Rovers F.C. players
Bohemian F.C. players
Drogheda United F.C. players
League of Ireland players
Glenavon F.C. players
NIFL Premiership players
Preston North End F.C. players
English Football League players